The Black Stuff may refer to

 The Black Stuff, BBC TV play directed by Jim Goddard that launched the Boys from the Blackstuff series
 Guinness, a drink sometimes referred to as "the black stuff"